Julian Roloff (born 17 January 2001) is a German footballer who plays as a goalkeeper for 1. FC Köln.

Early life
He played youth football with Bayer Leverkusen and Viktoria Köln. In 2018, he moved to the 1. FC Köln youth system.

Club career
On 27 April 2019, he debuted with 1. FC Köln II in the fourth tier Regionalliga West against SC Wiedenbrück. In January 2021, he extended his contract, and then he extended it again in January 2022. He terminated his contract with Köln in February 2022 in order to sign with a new club.

In March 2022, he signed with Canadian Premier League club Cavalry FC. He had initially had discussions about joining the club the previous year in 2021, but declined as he had just become the first-choice keeper with Köln II. He made his debut for Cavalry on April 9 against Atlético Ottawa.

In January 2023, he returned to training with his former club 1. FC Köln, with the first team squad. On 15 January, it was announced that Roloff would officially join Köln, with Cavalry retaining a percentage of any future transfer. He is expected to train with the first team as the fourth goalkeeper, while getting some game time with the second team in the Regionalliga.

Career statistics

Club

References

External links

Julian Roloff at FuPa

2001 births
Living people
German footballers
Association football goalkeepers
Regionalliga players
Canadian Premier League players
Bayer 04 Leverkusen players
FC Viktoria Köln players
1. FC Köln players
1. FC Köln II players
Cavalry FC players
German expatriate footballers
German expatriate sportspeople in Canada
Expatriate soccer players in Canada